Archduchess Gisela Louise Marie of Austria (12 July 1856 – 27 July 1932) was the second daughter and eldest surviving child of Emperor Franz Joseph I and Empress Elisabeth of Austria. 

Although christened Gisella, she only ever wrote her name with one L. Just like her elder sister Archduchess Sophie and her brother Crown Prince Rudolf, Gisela was raised by her paternal grandmother, Princess Sophie of Bavaria. Of a sober nature like her father, she kept a reserved attitude towards her mother. She had a very close relationship with her brother, whose suicide affected her greatly.

Life 
Her father collected some of the family's personal items, such as the first pair of shoes worn by each of his children. Among these keepsakes was a poem written for him by a young Gisela one Christmas; the poem was said to be the most treasured item among this collection. Archduchess Gisela was also known to paint in her later years.

Marriage and family 
On 20 April 1873, at the age of 16, Gisela was married to Prince Leopold of Bavaria in Vienna. Prince Leopold was a son of Prince Regent Luitpold of Bavaria and Auguste Ferdinande of Austria: Gisela's second cousin. Leopold had initially fallen for Princess Amalie of Saxe-Coburg and Gotha, whom Empress Elisabeth's younger brother Duke Maximilian Emanuel in Bavaria intended to marry. The Empress therefore arranged an encounter of Leopold and Gisela at Gödöllő Palace, and the prince knew he could not refuse her offer.

According to a letter to his mother written in 1872, Emperor Franz Josef wanted the match between his daughter and the Wittelsbach prince, as there were so few Catholic princes available at that time. It seems he felt he had to secure the only viable candidate to whom he could give Gisela (whom he called "our darling girl" during the wedding rites) with confidence. Prince Leopold received the immense dowry of a half a million guilders and soon overcame his former infatuation with Princess Amalie.

Gisela's mother remained absent during the wedding celebrations. The young couple was made welcome in Munich by her husband's family and went on to live in the Palais Leopold residence in Schwabing. The Palais was renamed Giselastraße in her honor in 1873.

Issue 

A year after her wedding, she gave birth to her first child and even Empress Elisabeth was present during the baptism. Gisela and Leopold had four children in total:
 Princess Elisabeth Marie of Bavaria (1874–1957), who married Otto Ludwig Philipp Graf von Seefried auf Buttenheim
 Princess Auguste Maria of Bavaria (1875–1964), who married Joseph August, Archduke of Austria
 Prince Georg of Bavaria (1880–1943), who married Archduchess Isabella of Austria
 Prince Konrad of Bavaria (1883–1969), who married Princess Bona Margherita of Savoy-Genoa

Charity works and World War I 
Especially after the death of her brother, Gisela was deeply involved in a variety of social and political issues and founded charities to support the poor, blind, and deaf people where she took an active role herself. During World War I she ran a military hospital in her Palais while her husband was a field marshal on the eastern front. When the Revolution broke out in 1918, the rest of her family fled the city, but Gisela remained and took part in the 1919 elections for the Weimar National Assembly where women above the age of 20 were allowed to vote for the first time.

Such was the esteem in which she was held that she was commonly known as the Good Angel from Vienna and became patron for a number of institutions, such as the Giselabahn (a train running from Salzburg to Tirol), the still active paddle steamer Gisela on the Traunsee and the Gisela Gymnasium in Munich.

Widowhood and death 
Gisela and her husband celebrated their golden wedding anniversary in 1923. Her husband died in 1930; Gisela only survived him by two years. She died aged 76 in Munich on 27 July 1932, and is buried next to Prince Leopold in the Colombarium at the St.Michaelskirche, Munich.

Honours 
She received the following orders:
 :
 Dame of the Order of the Starry Cross
 Grand Cross of the Order of Elizabeth, 1898
 :
 Dame of the Order of Theresa
 Dame of the Order of Saint Elizabeth
 : Dame of the Order of Saint Isabel
  Spain: 601st Dame of the Order of Queen Maria Luisa, 29 January 1863

Ancestry

Notes

References 
 Leopold Prinz von Bayern: Lebenserinnerungen
 Martha Schad: Kaiserin Elisabeth und ihre Töchter, Piper 2006
 Friedrich Weissensteiner: Liebeshimmel und Ehehöllen, Heyne 2000

External links

 Empress Elisabeth and her Family Magazine
 

Austrian princesses
Bavarian princesses
House of Habsburg-Lorraine
House of Wittelsbach
1856 births
1932 deaths
Austrian Roman Catholics
Patrons of schools
19th-century Austrian people
Knights of the Order of Saint Stephen of Hungary
Dames of the Order of Saint Isabel
People from Laxenburg
Franz Joseph I of Austria
Burials at St. Michael's Church, Munich
Daughters of emperors
Daughters of kings